Madtown is a 2016 action drama film, starring Milo Ventimiglia, and directed by Charles Moore. Filmed in Cleveland, Ohio, the film premiered at the 2016 Cleveland International Film Festival and had a limited theatrical release in the United States on for January 5, 2018.

Cast
 Milo Ventimiglia as Denny Briggs 
 Rachel Melvin as Sarah
 Amanda Aday as Madison Briggs
 John Billingsley as Loyd Zane Miller
 Bonita Friedericy as Linda Miller
 Matt Lockwood as Shaun
 Joshua Elijah Reese as Mandel
 Brett Castro as Young Denny
 Kinsley Funari as Young Madison

References

External links
 
 

American action drama films
Films shot in Cleveland
2016 films
2016 action drama films
2010s English-language films
2010s American films